Glabrousness (from the Latin glaber meaning "bald", "hairless", "shaved", "smooth") is the technical term for a lack of hair, down, setae, trichomes or other such covering. A glabrous surface may be a natural characteristic of all or part of a plant or animal, or be due to loss because of a physical condition, such as alopecia universalis in humans, which causes hair to fall out or not regrow.

In botany

Glabrousness or otherwise, of leaves, stems, and fruit is a feature commonly mentioned in plant keys; in botany and mycology, a glabrous morphological feature is one that is smooth and may be glossy. It has no bristles or hair-like structures such as trichomes. In anything like the zoological sense, no plants or fungi have hair or wool, although some structures may resemble such materials.

The term "glabrous" strictly applies only to features that lack trichomes at all times. When an organ bears trichomes at first, but loses them with age, the term used is glabrescent.

In the model plant Arabidopsis thaliana, trichome formation is initiated by the GLABROUS1 protein. Knockouts of the corresponding gene lead to glabrous plants. This phenotype has already been used in gene editing experiments and might be of interest as visual marker for plant research to improve gene editing methods such as CRISPR/Cas9.

In zoology

In varying degrees most mammals have some skin areas without natural hair. On the human body, glabrous skin is found on the ventral portion of the fingers, palms, soles of feet and lips, which are all parts of the body most closely associated with interacting with the world around us,  as are the labia minora and glans penis. There are four main types of mechanoreceptors in the glabrous skin of humans: Pacinian corpuscles, Meissner's corpuscles, Merkel's discs, and Ruffini corpuscles.

The Naked mole-rat (Heterocephalus glaber) has evolved skin lacking in general, pelagic hair covering, yet has retained long, very sparsely scattered tactile hairs over its body. Glabrousness is a trait that may be associated with neoteny.

Within entomology, the term glabrous is used to refer to those parts of an insect's body with are lacking in setae (bristles) or scales.

See also
 Glossary of botanical terms
 Glossary of entomology terms
 Trichophilia (hair fetishism)
 Merkin, a "pubic wig"

References

Plant morphology
Dermatologic terminology